Dudswell may refer to:

Dudswell, Quebec, a settlement in Le Haut-Saint-François Regional County Municipality, Canada
Dudswell, Hertfordshire a hamlet in Hertfordshire, England